Cobitis takatsuensis is a species of fish in the in the family Cobitidae. 
It is found in Japan.

Size

References

takatsuensis
Fish of Japan
Taxa named by Nobuhiko Mizuno
Fish described in 1970